"Living Proof" is a song by Cuban-American singer Camila Cabello from her second studio album Romance (2019), on which it appears as the second track. The song was released as the album's fifth single on November 15, 2019, along with the pre-order for the album.

Background
Cabello first teased the song in February 2019. She later announced the song's release on November 13, 2019. Cabello has stated that the song is one of her favorites she wrote for Romance, stating that it was "her way of coping as a hopeless romantic".

Composition
"Living Proof" is a pop song that runs for 3 minutes and 14 seconds. The song opens with a clapping beat and a steady guitar. Cabello uses religious imagery to describe her relationship with her lover, in addition to a falsetto used "in stomping and catchy chorus". The song's opening contains a sample of a recording by Andy Jones for his The Africa Heartwood Project, which contains orphans singing.

Music video
The Alan Ferguson-directed music video was released on November 24, 2019, the night of Cabello's American Music Awards performance of the song. It was inspired by the John Everett Millais painting Ophelia, which depicted the fictional Shakespearean character floating in a pool covered in flowers. Throughout the video, she is seen frolicking with a group of dancers and laying in a bed of petals. As of November 2020, it has over 22 million views and 502 thousand likes on YouTube.

Live performances
Cabello debuted the song at the American Music Awards, where she also performed "Señorita" alongside Shawn Mendes and "Shake It Off" alongside Taylor Swift and Halsey. On December 5, 2019, Cabello performed the song on The Tonight Show Starring Jimmy Fallon, as well as on The Ellen DeGeneres Show the next day.

Credits and personnel
Credits adapted from the liner notes of Romance.

Publishing
 Published by Sony/ATV Songs LLC (BMI) o/b/o Sony/ATV Music Publishing (UK) LTD/Maidmetal Limited (PRS)/Milamoon Songs (BMI) / WB Music Corp. (ASCAP) o/b/o Wolf Cousins and Warner/Chappel Music Scandinavia AB (STM) / Justin’s School for Girls (BMI) all rights o/b/o itself and Justin’s School for Girls admin. by Warner-Tamerlane Publishing Corp. (BMI) / © Reservoir 416 (BMI)/Ali Tamposi (BMI) all rights admin. by Reservoir Media Management, Inc.  
 Contains elements from "Meter Competition", courtesy of The Africa Heartwood Project

Recording
 Recorded at House Mouse Studios, Stockholm, Sweden, and by Ryan Dulude at Westlake Recording Studios, Los Angeles, California, and by Dustin Park at Henson Recording Studios, Los Angeles, California
 Mixed at MixStar Studios, Virginia Beach, Virginia
 Mastered at the Mastering Palace, New York City, New York
 Horns recorded and edited by Mattias Bylund at Studio Borgen, Partille, Sweden

Personnel

 Camila Cabello – vocals, songwriting, background vocals
 Ali Tamposi – songwriting
 Justin Tranter – songwriting
 Mattias Bylund – horn
 Peter Noos Johansson – trombone
 Serban Ghenea – mixing
 Mattman & Robin – production, songwriting, instrumentation, programming, keyboards, bass, guitar, claps, percussion, piano, brass, background vocals
 John Hanes – engineering
 Dustin Park – recording
 Ryan Dulude – recording
 Dave Kutch – mastering

Charts

Certifications

Release history

References

2019 singles
2019 songs
Camila Cabello songs
Songs written by Camila Cabello
Songs written by Ali Tamposi
Songs written by Robin Fredriksson
Songs written by Justin Tranter
Song recordings produced by Mattman & Robin
Songs written by Mattias Larsson
Music videos directed by Alan Ferguson (director)